Paul Bern (born Paul Levy; December 3, 1889September 5, 1932) was a German-born American film director, screenwriter, and producer for Metro-Goldwyn-Mayer, where he became the assistant to Irving Thalberg. He helped launch the career of Jean Harlow, whom he married in July 1932; two months later, he was found dead of a gunshot wound, leaving what appeared to be a suicide note. Various alternative theories of his death have been proposed. MGM writer and film producer Samuel Marx believed that he was killed by his ex-common-law wife Dorothy Millette, who jumped to her death from a ferry days afterward.

Early life and career
Bern was born Paul Levy in Wandsbek, which was then a town in the Prussian province of Schleswig-Holstein (now a district of the city of Hamburg). He was one of six children of Julius and Henriette (née Hirsch) Levy, a Jewish couple. Julius worked as a clerk for a shipping company before opening a candy store. In 1898, Julius decided to move the family to the United States due to the rise of unemployment and anti-Jewish attitudes in Wandsbek. The family eventually settled in New York City. Julius Levy died in 1908. In 1920, Henriette Levy drowned herself, possibly as a threat to keep her beloved son from marrying.

Bern pursued a career in acting on the stage and studied at the American Academy of Dramatic Arts. He later adopted the stage name "Paul Bern". Bern soon realized he had little aptitude for acting and pursued other aspects of theater production.  He worked as a stage manager for a time before moving to Hollywood in the early 1920s. He was initially a film editor before he worked his way up to scenario writing and directing for United Artists and Paramount Pictures. This led to his working full-time as a producer at Metro-Goldwyn-Mayer, the major studio of the time. Bern eventually became the production assistant of Irving Thalberg and then a producer on the MGM lot in his own right.

The star-studded film Grand Hotel, released six days after Bern's death, won the Best Picture Academy Award for 1931–1932.  Bern and Thalberg produced the film, although neither was listed in the film credits (in the early 1930s MGM did not list their films' producers in their credits).  The award was presented solely to Thalberg, however, since Bern, being deceased, obviously could not also accept it.

Personal life
In the 1920s, Bern fell in love with actress Barbara La Marr. She did not reciprocate his feelings, but the two remained close friends and confidants. He assisted her with her career, paid for her medical and funeral expenses, and was by her bedside when she died. Bern was also godfather to her son Don Gallery, and Jean Harlow was his godmother. Throughout most of Gallery's life he claimed Bern was his father, and that his adoptive parents ZaSu Pitts and Tom Gallery told him this, as well as close family friends such as Douglas Fairbanks Jr. and Leatrice Joy. However, a DNA test done by Gallery later proved that Bern was not his father. 

While living in New York City, Bern lived with his common-law wife Dorothy Millette (who was born Adele Roddy). The two had met in Toronto and their relationship began around 1911. Bern financially supported Millette, who reportedly suffered from mental and emotional problems and ended up in a Connecticut sanatorium. Millette traveled to Los Angeles in September 1932, where she reportedly visited Bern on the night of his death. Her body was found in the Sacramento River two days after Bern's death. It was later determined that she had committed suicide by jumping from the Delta King steamboat.

Bern met actress Jean Harlow shortly before the premiere of Hell's Angels in 1930. Bern was instrumental in helping Harlow's career, as he was the only person who took her seriously as an actress. The two struck up a friendship and eventually began dating. They announced their engagement in June 1932 and married on July 2, 1932. Throughout their relationship, Bern had an affair with his secretary Irene Harrison.

Death

Two months after marrying Jean Harlow, on September 5, Bern was found dead from a gunshot wound to the head in their home on Easton Drive in Beverly Hills, California. The coroner ruled his death a suicide.

Police discovered a note at the scene that read as follows:

"Dearest Dear,Unfortuately  this is the only way to make good the frightful wrong I have done you and to wipe out my abject humiliation, I Love  you. Paul You understand that last night was only a comedy"

Authorities viewed this as a suicide note signed by Bern. To the police, and before a grand jury, Harlow's only statement was that she "knew nothing". Harlow was made an executor of her husband's estate by the Californian judge.  Harlow never publicly spoke on the matter. She died of renal failure (caused by a childhood bout of scarlet fever) in June 1937 at the age of 26.

Two thousand people attended Bern's funeral, held on September 9, 1932, at the Grace Chapel at Inglewood Park Cemetery. Conrad Nagel delivered the eulogy. Bern was cremated, and his ashes were interred in the Golden West Mausoleum at Inglewood Park Cemetery.

Investigation reopened, 1960
In the November 1960 issue of Playboy, screenwriter Ben Hecht questioned the official verdict of Bern's death, causing renewed interest in the case. Hecht suggested that Bern was murdered by an unnamed woman and that the investigation into Bern's death  was a "suicide whitewash". Hecht went on to say that the explanation of Bern's suicide "would be less a black eye for their [MGM's] biggest movie making heroine. It might crimp her [Harlow's] box office allure to have her blazoned as a wife who couldn't hold her husband". The article prompted Los Angeles County District Attorney William B. McKesson to reopen the case, but McKesson later closed it, stating, "When I ordered the record check I assumed Hecht was still a responsible reporter. It now appears ... that he apparently was peddling a wild and unconfirmed rumor as fact."

Alternative theories
In 1990, film producer Samuel Marx, a friend  and MGM colleague of both Bern and Irving Thalberg, published a book giving a different version of Bern's death. Marx, at the time MGM's story editor (the head of the screenwriting department), said he had gone to Bern's house in the early morning of September 5, 1932, before the police were notified of the body's discovery, and had seen Thalberg tampering with the evidence. The next day, he had been among the studio executives who were told by Louis B. Mayer that the case would have to be ruled "suicide because of impotence" in order to avoid a scandal which would have finished Harlow's film career. Marx, after reviewing the evidence, concluded that Bern was murdered by his abandoned common-law wife Dorothy Millette, who then committed suicide by drowning, jumping overboard from the Delta King on the way from San Francisco to Sacramento, California.

Selected filmography

Director
Head over Heels (1922)
Open All Night (1924)
Flower of the Night (1925)
The Woman Racket (uncredited, 1930)

Producer
 Geraldine (1929)
 Noisy Neighbors (1929)
 Square Shoulders (1929)
 Anna Christie (1930)

Writer
 Greater Than Love (1919)
 The Marriage Circle (1924)
 Men (1924)
 Prince of Tempters (1926)
 The Beloved Rogue (1927)
 The Dove (1927)
 Grand Hotel (1932)

See also
List of unsolved deaths

References

Footnote
 Samuel Marx and Joyce Vanderveen: Deadly Illusions (Random House, New York, 1990), re-published as Murder Hollywood Style - Who Killed Jean Harlow's Husband? (Arrow, 1994)

External links

 
 
 Paul Bern short Biography
 "Shedunit", review of Deadly Illusions by Samuel Marx and Joyce Vanderveen, Time, October 1, 1990 by Otto Friedrich

1889 births
1932 suicides
19th-century German Jews
20th-century American male writers
20th-century American screenwriters
American Academy of Dramatic Arts alumni
American film directors
American film producers
American male screenwriters
Burials at Inglewood Park Cemetery
German emigrants to the United States
Suicides by firearm in California
Unsolved deaths in the United States